Portrayals of survivalism, and survivalist themes and elements such as survival retreats have been fictionalised in print, film, and electronic media. This genre was especially influenced by the advent of nuclear weapons, and the potential for societal collapse in light of a Cold War nuclear conflagration.

Films
 The 1962 movie Panic in Year Zero! starring Ray Milland, Jean Hagen, Frankie Avalon and Mary Mitchel portrays the Baldwin family's attempt to flee the Los Angeles area for a cave in a rural location after a nuclear war between the US and the USSR. 
 The 1970 movie No Blade of Grass starring Nigel Davenport, based on the book by John Christopher, features an apocalyptic scenario in England.
 Deliverance, both the 1970 novel and the 1972 film adaptation, feature elements of survivalism, and one of the main characters, Lewis Medlock (played in the film by Burt Reynolds), is a self-proclaimed survivalist, who at one point briefly explains his apocalyptic worldview: "Machines are going to fail, and the system is going to fail. And then...survival. Who has the ability to survive. That's the game, survival."
 The 1977 film Damnation Alley portrays a handful of survivors of a post-apocalyptic world driving across the country in a Landmaster.
 In the 1983 made for television comedy movie Packin' it In, the main character Gary Webber (Richard Benjamin) moves his family from suburban L.A. to the wilderness of Oregon. The family moves into a small rural community where most of the residents are survivalists. 
 In the comedy The Survivors, Robin Williams plays a man who becomes obsessed with the survivalist culture after being robbed. Walter Matthau costars as Williams' more level-headed companion.
 The 1984 movie Red Dawn portrays Colorado high school students who take to the hills after a fictional invasion of the US by the Soviet Union. The students survive with supplies gathered at the beginning of the invasion, by hunting, and by ambushing Soviet patrols and supply convoys.
 In the Tremors film and television franchise the character Burt Gummer (Michael Gross) is a self-proclaimed survivalist. In the first film he and his wife are preparing for social upheaval. Later in the series Burt shifts his focus towards the "graboids" that infest the soil of his home, Perfection Valley.
 The Postman, a movie based upon the novel of the same name, depicts a post-apocalyptic future in America in which a quasi-survivalist militia preys on weaker communities. 
 In Mad Max 2, a global oil shortage causes a total socioeconomic collapse and depopulation. The few scattered survivors in the Australian Outback are depicted fighting for survival, with precious "guzzoline" as their main object.
 In Terminator 2: Judgment Day (1991) John Connor's mother, Sarah Connor stores weapons in an underground cache in the desert, as instructed by Kyle Reese, John's father, in preparation for an apocalypse precipitated by computerized machines.
 In the 1999 film Blast from the Past was released. It is a romantic comedy film about a nuclear physicist, his wife, and son that enter a well-equipped spacious fallout shelter during the 1962 Cuban Missile Crisis. They do not emerge until 35 years after, in 1997. The film shows their reaction to recent society.
 On the 2002 film Ice Age, a flock of dodos led by the deranged Dab begin preparing for the harsh changes of the Ice Age by forming militant regimes, complete with combat training and marches, stockpiling food and instilling their doctrines that they don't migrate with others because they were superior to other creatures of their time, and that all other animals were nothing more than beasts.
 The 2007 film I Am Legend features Will Smith as Dr. Robert Neville, a military doctor immune from a virus that killed off the majority of mankind. Living in an abandoned New York City researching a cure for the virus, he fights  mutated human zombies and struggles to survive on his own. Set three years after the onset of the virus, Neville is equipped with an ample amount of supplies, including weapons, food, and fuel for electric generation.
 The 2009 science fiction film Pandorum features humanity building an interstellar ark to travel to an Earth-like planet because Earth is facing a Malthusian crisis. However something has gone wrong, tribal Morlocks now roam the ship hunting the members on board, and Earth has mysteriously disappeared. This leads to the members to fight over resources, resorting to muggings and cannibalism as there seems to be no crew to fly the ship.
 The 2010 film Tomorrow, When the War Began, based on the novel of the same name, features 8 teenagers waging a guerrilla war against an invading foreign power in their fictional Australian hometown.
 The 2011 horror film You're Next begins with an apparently simple horror plot which is then subverted when one of the protagonists is revealed to be survivalist-trained, responding to events with extreme competence.
 The 2012 film The Hunger Games, based on the novel of the same name, featured as punishment for a past rebellion, each of the 12 districts of the nation of Panem is forced by the victorious Capitol to annually select two tributes, one boy and one girl between the ages of 12 and 18, to fight to the death in the Hunger Games. 
 The 2015 science fiction thriller The Survivalist features a protagonist who survives in a time of starvation in Ireland through his use of tools, resources and strategy. The film is unusual in that all the characters depicted in the film are 'survivalists', as there has been a rapid period of population decline and only the most resourceful survive.

Games and other formats
 Fallen Earth is an MMORPG/Shooter set in a post-war, western-like Arizona. "The Suvivalists" appear here as a hostile non-playable faction.
 The Fallout series is a series of games set in a post-nuclear apocalyptic world. The gameplay is centered around the character's own survival instinct and skills, and communities of survivalists. This is taken further with Hardcore mode in Fallout: New Vegas, which introduces the need for the player character to eat, drink, and sleep in regular intervals, suffering increasingly severe stat penalties and eventually death if their needs are not met.
 In Grand Theft Auto: San Andreas, a mission involves stealing a harvester from a survivalist farm. Being reduced to being unable to bring in their crop easily, and risk starvation; the survivalists are portrayed as extremely violent and aggressive individuals.
 In the 2011 video game Homefront, a mission involves stealing a helicopter from a survivalist farm. These survivalists are also very aggressive and violent.
 The video games Metro 2033, and its sequel Metro: Last Light (based on the series of novels and stories) take place in post-apocalyptic Moscow, Russia, where people live in the metro subway tunnels after a nuclear attack.
 In Sid Meier's Alpha Centauri the Spartan Federation faction is run by a survivalist.
 S.T.A.L.K.E.R. is a series of games set in the apocalyptic wasteland of the "Exclusion Zone" surrounding the Chernobyl Nuclear Power Plant. The gameplay focuses heavily on survival and relations with factions of survivalists.
 The Wasteland video game was released in 1988, and was one of the first video games set in a post-apocalyptic world. The developers and designers of Wasteland went on to produce Fallout 1 & 2 and with the recent success of a Kickstarter campaign a sequel Wasteland 2 is being produced by a team including many of the original creators of Wasteland.
 The Last of Us is an action-adventure survival horror game released in 2013. The player controls Joel, a smuggler tasked with escorting teenage girl Ellie across a post-apocalyptic U.S. The player uses firearms, improvised weapons, and stealth to defend against hostile humans and zombie-like creatures (humans infected by a mutated strain of the Cordyceps fungus). Its sequel, The Last of Us Part II, was released in 2020.
 The Long Dark is an open world outdoor survival game launched through early access in 2014. The game takes place in the Canadian wilderness and the player controls a Bush Pilot who crashed during a "Geomagnetic disaster" - the plot device behind the lack of power. The player is required to loot food, clothing, medicines, tools and weapons to survive, and can use found items to craft clothes and weapons. In addition, Prepper Cache spawn in random locations that provide large amounts of survival gear. Threats include the weather and wolves whose aggression has been increased as a result of the plot device.
 Far Cry 5, the fifth main title of the Far Cry series released in 2018, takes place within the fictional Hope County, Montana where a militant doomsday cult called Project at Eden's Gate has seized autocratic control of the area and is actively preparing for the collapse of civilization. Some of the supporting characters who aid the player in their struggle against the cult are also preppers and many survivalist stashes can be found throughout the game where various rewards can be obtained.
Days Gone is a survival horror game released in 2019. Set in post-apocalyptic Oregon, the protagonist, Deacon St. John, is a former member of an outlaw motorcycle club who is searching for his missing wife. The majority of humanity has been infected by a virus that turned them into a zombie-like race called "Freakers", while the rest of humanity has assembled into opposing camps or has (willingly or unwillingly) joined a doomsday cult that worships the Freakers. Deacon uses survival skills on his journey, such as foraging, hunting, assembling/repairing weapons and/or his motorcycle using scrap lying around, and finding fuel to keep his motorcycle functioning.
 Cataclysm: Dark Days Ahead is an open source roguelike game focusing on realism and survival in post-apocalyptic New England.

Music
 The concept album Year Zero by industrial rock group Nine Inch Nails, is based around the theme of a hypothetical oppressive US government in the year 2022, and contains a single entitled "Survivalism".

Novels
 Daniel Defoe's novel Robinson Crusoe (1719) is about a man shipwrecked on a remote tropical island and forced to survive. It spawned an entire genre of fiction called Robinsonade, famously including Johann David Wyss's novel The Swiss Family Robinson (1812).
 R. M. Ballantyne's The Coral Island (1858) is the tale of three boys, survivors of a shipwreck, who are marooned on a South Pacific island.
 William Golding's novel Lord of the Flies (1954) is a response to Ballantyne's The Coral Island. In this case a larger group of boys being evacuated from England during a war survive the crash of their airplane on an isolated tropical island.
 Edward Abbey's novel Good News (1980) is about small bands of people in the Phoenix, Arizona area trying to fend off the rise of a military dictatorship after the collapse of the economy and government.
 Jerry Ahern's series of 29 novels, titled The Survivalist, was first published between 1981 and 1993.
 In Steve Boyett's novel Ariel (1983), all advanced technology ceases to function, while magic becomes real. The protagonist struggles to travel across a world filled with cannibals and other dangers.
 David Brin's novel The Postman (1985) is set in a time after a massive plague and political fracture result in a complete collapse of society. It unflatteringly portrays survivalists as one of the causes of the collapse, and so the quasi-survivalist "Holnist" characters are despised by the remaining population. The Holnists follow a totalitarian social theory idolizing the powerful who enforce their perceived right to oppress the weak. However, Brin later stated that when he was writing the book, survivalist was the best term to describe the militia movement.
 Ernest Callenbach's novel Ecotopia (1975), about the secession of the Pacific Northwest from the United States to form a new country based on environmentalism, named the political party governing the new country the Survivalist Party. However, in his sequel, Ecotopia Emerging (1981), he qualified that choice of name by having the party leader state that the term "Survivalist" referred to the survival of the planet's ecosystems, rather than to people who prepare for an economic or political collapse.
 Gordon R. Dickson's novel Wolf and Iron (1993) details the journey of a single man attempting to cross 2000 miles of hostile territory.  He faces roving gangs and fortified towns after a worldwide financial collapse.  This book is extremely detailed in its discussion of certain techniques and preparations needed in a post-apocalyptic world.
 Pat Frank's novel Alas, Babylon (1959) is a story dealing with life in Florida after a nuclear war with the USSR. 
 Pat Frank also authored the non-fiction book How To Survive the H Bomb And Why (1962)
 Dmitry Glukhovsky's novel Metro 2033, about survivors in Moscow, Russia, living in the city's subway tunnels after a nuclear attack, has spawned many spinoff stories, books, and video games that take place in the same setting and fictional universe.
 Harlan Ellison's post-apocalyptic science fiction short story I Have No Mouth And I Must Scream features a self-aware supercomputer who annihilates all of humanity but for 5 surviving people who the AI proceeds to torture. The novel won a Hugo Award in 1968.
 Robert A. Heinlein uses survivalism as a theme in much of his science fiction. For example, Tunnel in the Sky (1955) explores issues of survivalism and social interactions in an unfamiliar environment, and Farnham's Freehold (1964) begins as a story of survivalism in a nuclear war. Heinlein also wrote essays such as How to be a Survivor, which provide advice on preparing for and surviving a nuclear war.
 Stephen King's post-apocalyptic novel The Stand (1978) is set after a biological weapon pandemic. The surviving few slowly gather together only to realise that they are not alone.
 James Howard Kunstler's novel World Made By Hand (2008) is a "cozy catastrophe" set in upstate New York, in the near future, after the American economy has collapsed as a result of the combined impact of peak oil, global warming, an influenza pandemic, and nuclear terrorism. The characters struggle to reclaim lost skills, maintain order, and redevelop a pre-industrial revolution lifestyle in an agrarian village. In part, the novel explores the question of what happens when modern technology, based on electricity, is no longer available.
 Robert Merle's novel Malevil (1972) describes the refurbishing of a medieval castle and its use as a survivalist stronghold in the aftermath of a full-scale nuclear war. The book was adapted into a 1981 film directed by Christian de Chalonge and starring Michel Serrault, Jacques Dutronc, Jacques Villeret, and Jean-Louis Trintignant. .
 Jerry Pournelle and Larry Niven's novel Lucifer's Hammer (1977) is about a cataclysmic comet hitting the Earth, and various groups of people struggling to survive the aftermath in southern California. Lucifer’s Hammer has contributed significantly to the survivalist movement, as we understand it today. One reviewer noted:  "A comet’s impact with the Earth creates an extremely bad, worst-case “fast crash” scenario.  ...In this novel, people begin feeding on one another, literally, within a month of the event."" 
Pournelle and Niven's similarly themed "Footfall" (1985) is about aliens bombarding Earth using controlled meteorite strikes to exterminate life.
 Ayn Rand's novel Atlas Shrugged (1957) describes a group of highly creative people who withdraw from society into a hidden mountain valley while civilization totally collapses, whereupon they emerge to rebuild it. This book differs from others in the genre in that the protagonists' withdrawal directly causes the collapse, since it was they who sustained civilization.
 James Wesley Rawles's book Patriots: A Novel of Survival in the Coming Collapse (2009) is the first of a five-book novel series about a full-scale socio-economic collapse and subsequent invasion of the United States. The book describes in detail how the survivalist main characters establish a self-sufficient survival retreat in north-central Idaho. Three of the four original Patriots novel were New York Times bestsellers.
 Olaf Stapledon's monumental cosmic history Last and First Men includes an episode when the whole world is devastated by a nuclear chain reaction, which kills all humanity except for a few hundreds who happened to be near the North Pole. Their descendants eventually repopulate the world and create a new civilization, but this takes hundreds of thousands of years.
 George R. Stewart's novel Earth Abides (1949) deals with one man who finds most of civilization has been destroyed by a plague. Slowly, a small community forms around him as he struggles to start a new civilization, and preserve knowledge and learning.
 S.M. Stirling.'s alternate history, post-apocalyptic book Dies the Fire (2004) is the first in The Emberverse series. The story takes shape in a universe where electricity, guns, explosives, internal combustion engines, and steam power no longer work. The sequels flesh out the storyline in a survivalist post-Change world of agriculture, clan-based life, and conflict.
 H.G. Wells, who pioneered many subgenres of modern science fiction, contributed to this one as well. The later parts of his novel The War in the Air (1908) depict the collapse of modern civilization due to the massive use of weapons of mass destruction and the systematic destruction of cities, the grim struggle of the isolated few survivors, and the reversion of the world to semi-Medieval conditions - in all this anticipating recurring themes of later works.
 Philip Wylie's novel Tomorrow (1954) is the story of two American cities weathering a nuclear attack. One was prepared with an extensive civil defense plan, while the other was not.
 John Wyndham's novel The Day of the Triffids (1951) is the story of the survival of a small group of people in a post-apocalyptic world dominated by carnivorous plants, where most of the population is afflicted by blindness. It was later adapted into a feature film and TV series. It was also the inspiration for Danny Boyle's zombie film 28 Days Later (2002), which shares plot elements and survivalist themes.
 John Marsden's Tomorrow series of seven novels (published 1993–99) depict a high-intensity invasion and occupation of Australia by a foreign power. A small band of teenagers is waging a guerilla war on the enemy soldiers in the region around their fictional home town of Wirrawee. The name of the series is derived from the title of the first book, Tomorrow, When the War Began, which was adapted as a 2010 movie.
 Max Brooks' New York Times bestseller,  The Zombie Survival Guide (2003), is a survival manual dealing with the fictional potentiality of a zombie attack. It contains detailed plans for the average citizen to survive zombie uprisings of varying intensity and reach, and describes "cases" of zombie outbreaks in history, including an interpretation of Roanoke Colony. Survivalism and disaster preparation are also prevalent themes in Brooks' second novel, World War Z (2006). Brooks interest in the subject was sparked circa age 10, when he saw his very first zombie movie, Revenge of the Zombies (1943).
 Ben Elton's dystopia novel This Other Eden is a satirical environmentalist science fiction book set in the future, when Earth is devastated by systematic pollution and environmental disasters that seem intentional, as news of them is immediately broadcast from faraway sites in the presence of a terrorist pressure group of environmentalists. This is followed by a huge TV advertising campaign for self-contained survival environments manufactured, as the positive main character finds out, by a company controlled by both the egomaniacal TV network owner and the equally hideous sponsor of eco-terrorism, both of whom in the end are punished cruelly for their dastardly deeds. Earth eventually restores itself after its eco-Doomsday.
 Weir's science fiction novel The Martian follows an American astronaut, Mark Watney, as he becomes stranded alone on Mars and must improvise in order to survive. It has been described as Apollo 13 meets Cast Away. Ridley Scott directed an eponymous 2015 film adaptation starring Matt Damon.
 Neal Shusterman and his son Jacob Shusterman published the novel Dry, in 2018. It depicts a crisis scenario where California's water supply is cut off and thus its citizens do not have reliable access to water. The protagonist's neighbour Kelton is part of a survivalist family. Their home is fortified with water, food, an off-grid electricity generator, and solar panels. Like most preppers, they also have an offsite 'bug out' where they intend to travel to whilst the social chaos as a consequence of the water shortage, coined the Tap Out. The novel explores the game theory problems tackled when Kelton's neighbours who are not survivalists ask for free supplies.

Television programs

Series
 24 is a TV series about a federal agent named Jack Bauer and his attempts foil terrorist plots in Los Angeles. During Season 2 Jack's daughter, Kim Bauer, is on the run from the law and finds shelter with a survivalist.
 The TNT series Falling Skies tells the story of the aftermath of a global invasion by extraterrestrials . Within a few days the invaders neutralize the world's power grid and technology, destroy the armies of all the world's countries, and apparently kill over 90% of the human population. The aliens' objectives are not explained.  The story picks up six months after the invasion and follows a group of survivors who band together to fight back.
 Jericho (2006) is a TV series that portrays a small town in Kansas after a series of nuclear explosions across the United States. In the series, the character Robert Hawkins uses his prior planning and survival skills in preparation of the attacks. Most of the episodes center around the sudden collapse of American society resulting in a six-way split of the country. The town usually must fight an outside enemy in order to preserve their food and supplies. Jericho, as well as other media fiction (as Oddworld) also focuses on scavenging.
 Lost, a group of crash survivors are stranded on an island with little food and only the remains of the aircraft and baggage to survive with. Over the course of the series, the survivors adapt to life on the jungle isle while some even welcome it. One of the main characters of the series, John Locke, appears to be a survivalist even before the events of the crash, due to carrying knives with him as baggage, possessing hunting and tracking skills, and being part of a pseudo-survivalist commune earlier in life.
 Revolution is an NBC science fiction television series that takes place in a post-apocalyptic future. Fifteen years earlier, an unknown phenomenon disabled all advanced technology on the planet, ranging from computers and electronics to car engines, jet engines, and batteries. People were forced to adapt to a world without technology, and due to the collapse of public order, many areas are ruled by warlords and militias. The series focuses on the Matheson family, who possess an item that is the key to not only finding out what happened fifteen years ago, but also a possible way to reverse its effects. However, they must elude various enemy groups who want to possess that power for themselves.
 In the HBO TV series Six Feet Under, George Sibley's delusions manifests itself as a form of survivalism, and he becomes terrified that a number of apocalyptic or damaging events, ranging from nuclear war and the disappearance of water to earthquakes, are imminent and takes precautions against it, much to the horror of his wife - who realizes that it is beyond cautious and is becoming obsessive.
 Survivor (2000–present) is a reality television game show which places a group of contestants in remote location and awards a prize to the one which lasts the longest. Generally, the game is structured such that a player's social skills are more important to winning than survival skills.
 The BBC TV series Survivors, which ran from 1975 to 1977, suggested a UK view of survivalism with a small band of survivors emerging from a pandemic that wipes out more than 95% of the population. In 2008 and 2009 the BBC aired a new updated Survivors series, which was more hard-edged than the original, but still showed the protagonist "Abby Grant" and her ad hoc survival group as reluctant to arm themselves, even after being confronted by armed adversaries on numerous occasions.  In Episode 6 (which aired on Dec. 29, 2008) Abby's group is forced to abandon their quasi-retreat—a country estate—following a confrontation and kidnapping by a provisional government.
 Terminator: The Sarah Connor Chronicles (2008) is a science fiction show involving time travel with lead characters that take survivalist steps to prepare for, or possibly prevent, a future nuclear war.
 Sheldon Cooper, a character in The Big Bang Theory is a paranoid survivalist, he keeps at least two survival kits in his bedroom and has planned emergency escape routes from each room in the house. He also keeps a "Bug Out" bag in case he needs to leave at a moment's notice, as such a course of action is "recommended by the Department of Homeland Security. And Sarah Connor".
 Discovery Channel has aired two seasons of reality show The Colony in which a group of survivors try to survive in a "post apocalyptic world" where a majority of Earth's population is killed by a hypothetical "virus" and attempt to "rebuild".
 Two made-for-TV movies made during the 1980s, The Day After in the US and Threads in the UK, portray a nuclear war and its aftermath of social chaos and economic collapse. Both movies were, at the time, among the most controversial ever made for television.
 The Fire Next Time (1993) a made for television mini-series set in 2017 portrays the world undergoing green house gas-caused global warming caused natural disasters. The story follows the Morgan family, as they try to escape the floods, hurricanes and droughts and find a way to survive together against all odds. The movie starred Craig T. Nelson, Bonnie Bedelia and Justin Whalin.
 The AMC series The Walking Dead (2010–present) features a small group of survivors led by Rick Grimes of a worldwide "zombie apocalypse". The group moves together, scavenging what they can from the remains of society, while fighting off a seemingly endless number of zombies (which they refer to as "walkers"). The group starts off as a camp outside the city of Atlanta, Georgia.
  In The 100 (2014–2020), the series is set 97 years after a devastating nuclear apocalypse wiped out almost all life on Earth. The only known survivors lived on 12 space stations in Earth's orbit prior to the apocalyptic event. After the Ark's life-support systems are found to be critically failing, 100 juvenile prisoners are declared "expendable" and sent to the surface – near the former Washington, DC – in a last ditch attempt to determine whether Earth is habitable again, in a program called "The 100". The teens arrive in a drop ship on a seemingly pristine planet that they have only seen from space. They attempt to find refuge and supplies at an old military installation, Mount Weather Emergency Operations Center, located in the foothills of the Blue Ridge Mountains.
 Man vs. Wild (2006-2011) Bear Grylls travels around the globe to find the most dangerous tourist locations and environments, in order to show us how to survive in them. With his simple survival techniques and his knowledge of the wildlife, he is able to give handy tips that could effectively save lives. Whether it's traversing across volcanoes or stuck on a desert island, Bear is always one step ahead when it comes to survival of the fittest.

Episodes
In the 1987 Twilight Zone segment "Shelter Skelter", a survivalist and his non-survivalist friend take up perpetual residence in a fallout shelter following a nuclear explosion. The segment contrasts their differing capabilities of handling the situation.
Fear the Walking Dead, season 3, episode 3: "TEOTWAWKI", shows the origins of a community of survivalists founded pre-apocalypse.

References